Gordon Dallas (born 13 February 1959 in Durban) is a retired South African-American soccer defender who played three seasons in the North American Soccer League.

Gordon, a native of South Africa, attended high school in San Diego where he played soccer and ran cross country.  He played on the San Diego State University men's soccer team from 1977 to 1980. In 1981, he signed with the San Diego Sockers of the North American Soccer League.  The Sockers released him at the end of the 1982 season.  In March 1983, he had an unsuccessful trial with the Fort Lauderdale Strikers before rejoining the Sockers. In August 1983, the Sockers traded him to the Strikers in exchange for a draft pick.

References

External links
 NASL stats

1959 births
Living people
American soccer players
Fort Lauderdale Strikers (1977–1983) players
North American Soccer League (1968–1984) players
North American Soccer League (1968–1984) indoor players
San Diego State Aztecs men's soccer players
San Diego Sockers (NASL) players
Sportspeople from Durban
Association football defenders